Wilhelmina Hendrika "Mien" Schopman-Klaver (26 February 1911 – 10 July 2018) was a Dutch athlete who was a reserve for the 4 × 100 metres relay at the 1932 Summer Olympics in Los Angeles. She was born in Amsterdam.

Personal best marks
 100 m: 12.7 s (August 1931, Amsterdam)
 Long jump: 
 High jump:

Notes

References
 'Wat!? Ik naar de Olympische Spelen? Enig!' 

1911 births
2018 deaths
Dutch centenarians
Dutch female sprinters
Athletes from Amsterdam
Women centenarians